"Down By the Bay" is a traditional children's song.  A famous version was performed by Raffi and appears on his 1976 album Singable Songs for the Very Young; it is his signature song. In an interview with the Vulture Newsletter, Raffi described it as being “An old, old song", saying that "It may have been a World War I song... It came from England.”  A Greek folk song called "Γιαλό, γιαλό" ("γιαλό" meaning "bay" or "seaside") exists with this same melody. It is an Ionian Cantada, a style of folk music that originated in the late 19th century. Thus, the actual origin of this song may be uncertain. 

In recent years, it has gained popularity as a campfire song among the Scouting Movement in Britain. Another version of the song is "Down by the Sea." The chorus from this was used by the folk band, Fiddler's Dram, in their song "Johnny John."

The song lyrics are usually as follows:

Usually, the insertion lyrics follow some kind of variation of the question "Did/(Have) you ever see(n) a _ _ing a _?", with the first and last blank rhyming. For example:
 "Did you ever see a moose kissing a goose?" (or "goose kissing a moose")
 "Did you ever see a whale with a polka dot tail?"
 "Did you ever see a fly wearing a tie?"
 "Did you ever see a bear combing his hair?"
 "Did you ever see a llama eating pajamas?"
 "Did you ever see a goat rowing a boat?"
 "Did you ever see a dragon pulling a wagon?"
 "Did you ever see a fox putting on socks?"
 "Did you ever see a fish doing hula on a dish?"
 "Did you ever see a parrot eating a carrot?"
 "Did you ever see a rhino kissing a dino?" (from Barney & Friends) 

The song can be ended with the following line:
 "Did you ever have a time when you couldn't make a rhyme?"

Each of the rhyming lines is followed by the ending line:
 "Down by the bay?"

References

English children's songs
1910s songs
Songwriter unknown
Year of song unknown